The Imperial Tournament was a professional golf tournament that was held in Japan from 1987 to 1993. It was an event on the Japan Golf Tour from 1990.  It was played at the Seve Ballesteros Golf Club near Inashiki in Ibaraki Prefecture until 1992 and at the Caledonian Golf Club near Yokoshibahikari in Chiba Prefecture in 1993.

Winners

Notes

References

External links
Coverage on Japan Golf Tour's official site

Former Japan Golf Tour events
Defunct golf tournaments in Japan
Recurring sporting events established in 1987
Recurring sporting events disestablished in 1993